Ernest Davies (31 January 1916 – 17 August 1942) was an English professional footballer who played as a wing half in the Football League for Tranmere Rovers.

Personal life
Davies served as a corporal in the 1st Battalion, King's Own Royal Regiment (Lancaster) during the Second World War. He enlisted in 1940 and was deployed overseas . His body was never recovered, and he is commemorated on the Alamein Memorial.

Career statistics

References

1916 births
1942 deaths
People from Heswall
Footballers from Merseyside
Association football wing halves
English footballers
English Football League players
Heswall F.C. players
Tranmere Rovers F.C. players
York City F.C. players
Tranmere Rovers F.C. wartime guest players
King's Own Royal Regiment soldiers
British Army personnel killed in World War II
Deaths due to shipwreck at sea
Military personnel from Merseyside